Oak Grove is an unincorporated community in Gadsden County, Florida, United States. It is located near the intersection of Memorial Blue Star Highway and Smithtown Road, northwest of Mount Pleasant, Florida.

Notes

Unincorporated communities in Gadsden County, Florida
Unincorporated communities in Florida